Iowa's 5th congressional district is an obsolete congressional district in the U.S. state of Iowa. It was last represented by Republican Steve King in 2013, who continued to serve in the U.S. House of Representatives after the district's obsolescence as the representative for Iowa's 4th congressional district.

The district became obsolete for the 113th U.S. Congress as Iowa lost a seat in the U.S. House of Representatives as a result of redistricting based upon the 2010 Census. Official redistricting maps divided the territory in this district in half, adding the northern portion to the 4th district and the southern portion to the 3rd district.

History

Iowa's 5th congressional district was redistricted in 1942. U.S. Representative Karl M. LeCompte from Iowa's 5th congressional district became the representative of the 4th congressional district; U.S. Representative Paul H. Cunningham was the representative from Iowa's 6th congressional district.

Iowa's 5th congressional district was also redistricted in 1972. U.S. Representative Neal Smith was taken out of Iowa's 5th congressional district and put in the 4th congressional district. U.S. Representative William J. Scherle was taken out of Iowa's 7th congressional district (which was permanently removed) and put into the 5th congressional district where he ran against future U.S. Senator Tom Harkin.

On June 22, 2001, the Iowa General Assembly passed a plan to redistrict the State of Iowa. The plan went into effect in 2002 for the 108th U.S. Congress. The prior redistricting plan was effective from 1992–2001.

The district was eliminated following the 2010 redistricting cycle.

Presidential election results
Election results from presidential races:

List of members representing the district

Historical election results

Recent election results

2002

2004

2006

2008

2010

See also
Iowa's congressional districts

References

External links

 Congressional Biographical Directory of the United States 1774–present

05
Former congressional districts of the United States
1863 establishments in Iowa
Constituencies established in 1863
2013 disestablishments in Iowa
Constituencies disestablished in 2013